Le Mas-d’Artige is a commune in the Creuse department in the Nouvelle-Aquitaine region in central France.

Geography
The commune is home to the source waters of the river Creuse, in the natural park of the Millevaches (1000 lakes, not cows).

Population

Sights
 The nineteenth-century church.
Ancient houses at la Vialle.
 A ruined church at Villefert.
 A sixteenth-century cross in the cemetery.
 A twelfth-century Templars cross.

See also
Communes of the Creuse department

References

Communes of Creuse